Lavinia Gould (born 15 March 1983) is a New Zealand rugby league footballer who plays for the Brisbane Broncos in the NRL Women's Premiership.

A  in rugby league and a flyhalf in rugby union, she is a former New Zealand and New Zealand sevens representative and previously played for the Queensland Reds in the Super W.

Playing career

Rugby union
Born in Whakatane, Gould played provincial rugby union for Bay of Plenty and Wellington. In 2000, at 17-years old, she was a member of the first official New Zealand women's sevens team, who took part in the Hong Kong Sevens.

On 9 November 2013, she was suspended for two years by the IRB following a positive drug test after the 2012 Dubai Women's Sevens. Gould tested positive for methylhexaneamine (MHA), which was found in a dietary supplement she used during the tournament.

In May 2015, she returned from her ban and represented the New Zealand sevens team at the 2014–15 World Rugby Women's Sevens Series.

In 2018, Gould joined the Queensland Reds in the Super W competition. On 20 April 2018, she was named Player of the Final in the Reds' 13–16 loss to the New South Wales Waratahs.

Rugby league
On 10 August 2018, Gould signed with the Brisbane Broncos NRL Women's Premiership team. On 3 September 2018, she played her first game of rugby league in the Broncos' pre-season trial win over Papua New Guinea.

In Round 1 of the 2018 NRL Women's season, she made her debut for the Broncos' in their 30–4 win over the St George Illawarra Dragons. On 30 September 2018, she came off the bench and scored a try in the Broncos' 34–12 Grand Final win over the Sydney Roosters. On 12 October 2018, she was named in the New Zealand squad for their Test match against Australian Jillaroos but did not play.

In 2019, she joined the Wests Panthers in the QRL Women's Premiership. In June 2019, she was 19th player for the Queensland State of Origin team. On 6 October 2019, she started at hooker and scored a try in the Broncos' 30–6 Grand Final win over the Dragons. On 11 October 2019, she was named in New Zealand's Test team but later withdrew due to personal reasons.

In 2020, Gould played the first two games of the 2020 NRL Women's season for the Broncos. She suffered a leg injury in their Round 2 win over the St George Illawarra Dragons, forcing her to miss the rest of the season and, subsequently, the club's Grand Final win over the Roosters.

References

External links
Brisbane Broncos profile

1983 births
Living people
Brisbane Broncos (NRLW) players
New Zealand female rugby league players
New Zealand female rugby sevens players
New Zealand female rugby union players
New Zealand women's international rugby sevens players
New Zealand international rugby union players
Rugby league hookers
Rugby league players from Whakatāne
Rugby union players from Whakatāne